Roberto Guillermo Pizarro Hofer (born 9 October 1944) is a Chilean politician who served as minister of State and as head of the Academy of Christian Humanism University. He also was head of the La Nación newspaper.

References

External links
 Columns at La Voz De Los Que Sobran

1944 births
Living people
University of Chile alumni
Alumni of the University of Sussex
Heads of universities in Chile
20th-century Chilean politicians
21st-century Chilean politicians
Socialist Party of Chile politicians